Cell Cycle is a biweekly peer-reviewed scientific journal covering all aspects of cell biology. It was established in 2002 with Mikhail V. Blagosklonny (Roswell Park Comprehensive Cancer Center) as founding editor-in-chief. Originally published bimonthly, it is now published biweekly.

Abstracting and indexing
The journal is abstracted and indexed in:

According to the Journal Citation Reports, the journal has a 2017 impact factor of 3.304.

See also
 Autophagy
 Cell Biology International
 Cell and Tissue Research

References

External links
 

Molecular and cellular biology journals
Biweekly journals
Publications established in 2002
English-language journals
Taylor & Francis academic journals